Jiřina Nekolová (30 December 1931 — 25 May 2011) was a Czech figure skater who competed for Czechoslovakia. She was the 1948 World bronze medalist and placed fourth at the 1948 Winter Olympics.

Results

References

Czech female single skaters
Czechoslovak female single skaters
Olympic figure skaters of Czechoslovakia
Figure skaters at the 1948 Winter Olympics
Figure skaters from Prague
1931 births
2011 deaths
World Figure Skating Championships medalists